Oil Mines Regulations-1984(OMR 1984) replaces the Oil Mines Regulations-1933, with effect from October 1984 to deal with matters for the prevention of possible dangers in oil mines in India.

OMR 1984 was Published in 1986 by Directorate General of Mines Safety, Ministry of Labour in Dhanbad, Jharkhand.

Salient Features
Chapter-1 Priliminary
Short Title; Extent; Application and; Definitions. (Reg 1–2)
Chapter-II 
Returns, Notices and Plans. (Reg 3–9) 
Chapter-III : Inspectors, Management and Duties 
Qualifications; Appointment; General Management and; Duties of Pe
ns Employed in Mines for various functions. (Reg 10–23) 
Chapter-IV : Drilling and Workover 
Reg 24- Derricks; 25- Derrick platforms and floors; 26- Ladders; 27- Safety belts and life lines; 28- Emergency escape device; 29- Weight indicator; 30- Escape exits; 31- Guardrails, handrails and covers; 32- Draw-works; 33- Cathead and cat line; 34-  Tongs; 35-  Safety chains or wire lines; 36- Casing lines; 37-  Rigging equipment for material handling; 38- Storage of materials; 39- Construction and loading of pipe-racks; 40-  Rigging-up and rig dismantling; 41-  Mud tanks and mud pumps; 42-  Blowout preventer assembly; 43-  Control system for blowout preventers; 44-  Testing of blowout preventer assembly; 45-  Precautions against blowout; 46-  Precautions after a blowout has occurred; 47-  Drilling workover and other operations; 48-  Precautions during drill stem test. 
Chapter-V: Production 
Well completion, Testing and Activation (Reg 49–50)

Group Gathering Station and Emergency Plan (Reg 51-51A)

Precautions during acidizing operations; fractu operations and; loading and unloading of petroleum tankers. (Reg 52–54)
 
Storage Tank; Well servicing operations;  Artificial lifting of oil;   Temporary closure of producing well and; Plugging requirements of abandoned wells (Reg 55–59)
Chapter-V: Production 
Application (Reg-60)
Chapter-VI : Transport and pipelines
Approval and design of the route and design of pipeline, their laying and, Emergency procedure. (Reg 61–64) 
Chapter - VII : Protection against Gases and Fires
Storage and use of flammable material; Precaution against noxious, flammable gases and, fire; Fire Fighting Equipment and; Contingency plan. (Reg 65–72)
Chapter-VIII : Machinery, Plant and Equipment 
Use of certain machinery and equipment; Classification of Hazardous Area;  Use of electrical equipment in hazardous area; General Provisions about construction and maintenance of machinery;  Internal combustion Engines;  Apparatus under pressure;  Precautions regarding moving parts of machinery; Engine rooms and their exits and;   Working and examination of machinery. (Reg 73–81) 
Chapter-IX : General Safety Provision
Housekeeping; General/Emergency lighting; Supply and use of protective equipments; Protection against noise, toxic dusts, gases and ionising radiation ; Communication;  Protection against pollution of environment; Fencings and;  General Safety. (Reg 82–98) 
Chapter-X : Miscellaneous
Safety and health education, instructions and, inspections;  Returns, notices, correspondence and Appeals. (Reg 99-106)

References

See also
Oil spill

Mining law and governance
Mine safety
Occupational safety and health organizations
Safety engineering
Indian legislation
Oil spills
Technology hazards
Bird mortality
Ocean pollution
Product safety scandals
Road hazards